Reptiles found in Egypt include:

Family Gekkonidae

Genus Cyrtopodion 
 Cyrtopodion scabrum

Genus Hemidactylus 
 Hemidactylus flaviviridis
 Hemidactylus foudaii
 Hemidactylus mindiae
 Hemidactylus robustus
 Hemidactylus sinaitus
 Hemidactylus turcicus

Genus Pristurus 
 Pristurus flavipunctatus

Genus Ptyodactylus 
 Ptyodactylus guttatus
 Ptyodactylus hasselquistii
 Ptyodactylus ragazzii
 Ptyodactylus siphonorhina

Genus Stenodactylus 
 Stenodactylus mauritanicus
 Stenodactylus petrii
 Stenodactylus sthenodactylus

Genus Tarentola 
 Tarentola annularis
 Tarentola mauritanica
 Tarentola mindiae

Genus Tropiocolotes 
 Tropiocolotes bisharicus
 Tropiocolotes natterei
 Tropiocolotes nubicus
 Tropiocolotes steudneri
 Tropiocolotes tripolitanus

Family Agamidae

Genus Agama 
 Agama spinosa

Genus Laudakia 
 Laudakia stellio

Genus Pseudotrapelus 
 Pseudotrapelus sinaitus

Genus Trapelus 
 Trapelus mutabilis
 Trapelus pallidus
 Trapelus savignii

Genus Uromastyx 
 Uromastyx aegyptia
 Uromastyx ocellata
 Uromastyx ornata

Family Chamaeleonidae

Genus Chamaeleo 
 Chamaeleo africanus
 Chamaeleo chamaeleon

Family Lacertidae

Genus Acanthodactylus 
 Acanthodactylus aegyptius
 Acanthodactylus boskianus
 Acanthodactylus longipes
 Acanthodactylus pardalis
 Acanthodactylus scutellatus

Genus Latastia 
 Latastia longicaudata

Genus Mesalina 
 Mesalina bahaeldini
 Mesalina brevirostris
 Mesalina guttulata
 Mesalina martini
 Mesalina olivieri
 Mesalina pasteuri
 Mesalina rubropunctata

Genus Ophisops 
 Ophisops elbaensis
 Ophisops elegans
 Ophisops occidentalis

Genus Philochortus 
 Philochortus zolii

Genus Pseuderemias 
 Pseuderemias mucronata

Family Varanidae

Genus Varanus 
 Varanus griseus
 Varanus niloticus

Family Scincidae

Genus Ablepharus 
 Ablepharus rueppellii

Genus Chalcides 
 Chalcides ocellatus
 Chalcides cf. humilis

Genus Eumeces 
 Eumeces schneiderii

Genus Scincus 
 Scincus scincus

Genus Sphenops 
 Sphenops sepsoides

Genus Trachylepis 
 Trachylepis quinquetaeniata
 Trachylepis vittata

Family Typhlopidae

Genus Ramphotyphlops 
 Ramphotyphlops braminus

Genus Typhlops 
 Typhlops vermicularis

Family Leptotyphlopidae

Genus Leptotyphlops 
 Leptotyphlops cairi
 Leptotyphlops macrorhynchus
 Leptotyphlops nursii

Family Boidae

Genus Eryx 
 Eryx colubrinus
 Eryx jaculus

Family Colubridae

Genus Dasypeltis 
 Dasypeltis scabra

Genus Dolichophis 
 Dolichophis jugularis

Genus Eirenis 
 Eirenis coronella

Genus Hemorrhois 
 Hemorrhois algirus
 Hemorrohis nummifer

Genus Lycophidion 
 Lycophidion capense

Genus Lytorhynchus 
 Lytorhynchus diadema

Genus Macroprotodon 
 Macroprotodon cucullatus

Genus Malpolon 
 Malpolon moilensis
 Malpolon monspessulanus

Genus Natrix 
 Natrix tessellata

Genus Platyceps 
 Platyceps florulentus
 Platyceps rogersi
 Platyceps saharicus
 Platyceps sinai

Genus Psammophis 
 Psammophis aegyptius
 Psammophis punctulatus
 Psammophis schokari
 Psammophis sibilans

Genus Rhynchocalamus 
 Rhynchocalamus melanocephalus

Genus Spalerosophis 
 Spalerosophis diadema

Genus Telescopus 
 Telescopus dhara
 Telescopus hoogstraali

Family Elapidae

Genus Naja 
 Naja haje
 Naja nubiae

Genus Walterinnesia 
 Walterinnesia aegyptia

Family Atractaspididae

Genus Atractaspis 
 Atractaspis engaddensis

Family Viperidae

Genus Cerastes 
 Cerastes cerastes
 Cerastes vipera

Genus Echis 
 Echis coloratus
 Echis pyramidum

Genus Pseudocerastes 
 Pseudocerastes fieldi

Family Crocodylidae

Genus Crocodylus 
 Crocodylus niloticus

Family Testudinidae

Genus Testudo 
 Testudo kleinmanni

Family Cheloniidae

Genus Caretta 
 Caretta caretta

Genus Chelonia 
 Chelonia mydas

Genus Eretmochelys 
 Eretmochelys imbricata

Genus Lepidochelys 
 Lepidochelys olivacea

Family Dermochelyidae

Genus Dermochelys 
 Dermochelys coriacea

Family Trionychidae

Genus Trionyx 
 Trionyx triunguis

Family Emydidae

Genus Trachemys 
 Trachemys scripta (introduced)

References 
 Saleh, M (1997). Amphibians and Reptiles of Egypt. National Biodiversity Unit - Egyptian Government.
 Baha el Din, Sherif (2006). A Guide to Reptiles & Amphibians of Egypt. The American University in Cairo Press. .
 El-Gabbas, Ahmed; Baha el Din, Sherif; Zalat, Samy; Gilbert, Francis (2016). "Conserving Egypt's reptiles under climate change". Journal of Arid Environments, 127: 211–221. .

Egypt

Egypt
Reptiles